The conflict between the Democratic Party of Iranian Kurdistan (KDPI) and the Komala Party of Iranian Kurdistan began when the latter refused to stop calling the former a "class enemy" and the tensions started to grow. Komala continued making anti-KDPI propaganda, and subsequently KDPI declared war on Komala. Both Kurdish organizations ended up simultaneously fighting against Iranian forces separately.

References 

20th century in Iran
Wars involving Iran
Iran–Iraq relations
20th-century conflicts
Kurdish rebellions in Iran
Iran–Iraq War